Reece Blayney (born 24 July 1985) is an Australian former professional rugby league footballer who last played for the Wynnum Manly Seagulls in the Queensland Cup competition. Blayney previously played for teams such as the Canterbury-Bankstown in Australia's National Rugby League (NRL), AS Carcassonne in France's Elite One Championship, and the Fairfax Eagles in the United States' American National Rugby League (AMNRL).

Early life
Blayney was born in Cronulla, New South Wales and played junior footy for Gymea Gorillas.

Playing career
In 2008, Blayney was signed by Canterbury in Australia's National Rugby League (NRL). Blayney also spent time in the New South Wales Premier League with the Cronulla Sharks and the St. George Dragons. In the 2009–2010 season, Blayney signed with AS Carcassonne in the top-flight Elite One Championship in France. 

Blayney subsequently signed with the Fairfax Eagles of the American National Rugby League (AMNRL), the top competition in the United States, playing during the 2010 season. Blayney was one of the most high-profile signings in American rugby league.

For the 2011 season, Blayney signed with the Wynnum Manly Seagulls in Australia's Queensland Cup competition.

References

External links
Bulldogs profile

1985 births
Living people
AS Carcassonne players
Australian expatriate rugby league players
Australian expatriate sportspeople in France
Australian expatriate sportspeople in the United States
Australian rugby league players
Canterbury-Bankstown Bulldogs players
Expatriate rugby league players in France
Expatriate rugby league players in the United States
Northern Virginia Eagles players
Rugby league five-eighths
Rugby league halfbacks
Rugby league players from Sydney
Wynnum Manly Seagulls players